John Taylor (30 July 1750 – 23 June 1826) was an entrepreneur, poet and composer of hymns from Norwich, England.

Early life
John Taylor was born to Richard and Margaret Taylor, and was baptised in the parish of St. George's Colegate, Norwich. Richard Taylor was a local manufacturer and son of Dr. John Taylor.

At age eight, Taylor was sent to study with a businessman in the village of Hindolveston. Shortly after his father's death in 1762 he returned home to assist his mother with her affairs.

Career
Taylor returned to business three years later with an apprenticeship to two local manufacturers until 1768, when he left Norwich for a job as a bank-clerk in London, at Dinsdale, Archer and Ryde.  It was during this time that he contributed occasional poetical pieces to the Morning Chronicle, one of which was entitled Verses written on the back of a Bank Note, a humorous look at the cashiers working the principal banking houses.

In 1773 he returned to Norwich and joined his brother Richard in the business of yarn manufacture. Four years later saw his marriage to Susanna, and the following year saw the beginnings of his work for the church. Taylor was first chosen to be a deacon, and went on to become treasurer of the church's benefactions.  Taylor also oversaw the funding of local schools and his business expertise led to an increase in their funds. In 1781 he was elected to the Board of Guardians, an organisation responsible for administering and distributing funds of parish workhouses, places where people who were unable to support themselves could go to live and work.  While on the board, Taylor set about training the paupers of Norwich to spin yarn, earning many thousand pounds for the parish. In 1784, having restored the family fortunes, he took an active part in the foundation of the Norwich Public Library. He developed an interest in local politics, joining the Whig party as a radical reformer, emerging as their leader in Norwich. He made social contact with HRH Duke of Sussex, the duke of Albemarle, and John Coke, Squire of Holkham Hall, who was nationally known as an agriculturalist.

Illness and death
Starting around 1802, Taylor was afflicted by severe pains resulting from gout. He wrote the following about his illness:

Taylor suffered many years of illness and found himself bedridden for a time.  In the 1810s he regained some strength and by 1814 he contributed a selection of hymns for the congregation of the Octagon Chapel, a Chapel which his father had helped to build and maintain.

While Taylor was being driven by horse and carriage with his son Philip, the horse was spooked, causing its driver and passengers to be thrown on the road.  Taylor lost consciousness and was returned to his son Philip's house at Halesowen; he did eventually regain consciousness, although he could not speak.  Taylor had begun to regain his speech when he took another turn for the worse and he died on 23 June 1826 at Halesowen.

Works
Amongst his various business duties Taylor also found time to express himself on paper:
 In 1784, inspired by a family reunion, he wrote his first family song; his song so pleased the attendees that it became regular practice for him to pen verses for festive gatherings.
 In 1789 Taylor wrote The Trumpet of Liberty, perhaps his best known work; on 5 November of that year Taylor sang this piece at a public dinner celebrating the first anniversary of the French Revolution.
 In 1790 he contributed poetry to The Norwich Cabinet, a radical political publication which also featured poems by Amelia Opie. In 1797 he also began to compile the history of the local Octagon congregation.

Family
In 1777, John married Susannah Cook, daughter of John Cook, a former Mayor of Norwich. Their home became the centre of a radical social gathering.  Guests included Sir James Mackintosh, Sir James Edward Smith the botanist, Henry Crabb Robinson the barrister, Robert Southey, poet laureate, and Cecilia Windham, wife of William Windham. Others to be found there were William Enfield, and some early supporters of the French Revolution: Edward Rigby, James Alderson and his daughter Amelia.

John and Susannah raised seven children. Meticulous keepers of accounts, they drilled their children to be honest, to avoid debt, and to take control of their business dealings. Their sons were successful and prominent in learned societies. The children were:

 John (1779–1863);
 Richard (1781–1858);
 Edward (1784–1863);
 Philip (1786–1870);
 Susan (b. 1788), married Henry Reeve;
 Arthur (b. 1790), a printer and FSA, author of The Glory of Regality (London, 1820), and Papers in relation to the Antient Topography of the Eastern Counties (London, 1869).
 Sarah, wife of John Austin the jurist.

References

1750 births
1826 deaths
English hymnwriters
Writers from Norwich
English Unitarians